Sajjad Esteki (born 23 April 1990) is an Iranian handball player who currently plays for CSM Bacău and the Iran men's national handball team.

Esteki was the top scorer in the 2009 Youth World Handball Championship with 65 goals. He repeated the same performance in 2011, being top scorer in the Junior World Handball Championship with 84 goals.

Individual awards 
 Romanian Liga Națională Best Foreign Player: 2016
 Prosport All-Star Left Back of the Romanian Liga Națională: 2017
 Romanian Liga Națională MVP: 2018

References

Iranian male handball players
Living people
1990 births
Asian Games silver medalists for Iran
Asian Games medalists in handball
Handball players at the 2010 Asian Games
Expatriate handball players
Iranian expatriates in Germany
Iranian expatriates in Qatar
Iranian expatriates in Romania
CS Dinamo București (men's handball) players
Medalists at the 2010 Asian Games
21st-century Iranian people